Handy Brake National Wildlife Refuge is located just north of Bastrop, Louisiana in Morehouse Parish, north central Louisiana. The refuge was established in 1988 with the southeast's first fee title transfer of a Farmer's Home Administration tract (466 acres) to the U.S. Fish and Wildlife Service.

Wildlife and habitat
Handy Brake NWR has a wood duck nest box project. Water levels are manipulated to provide optimal habitat for nesting and wintering ducks. The refuge lands cleared for agriculture prior to the establishment of the refuge have been reforested to bottomland hardwoods.

An observation platform overlooks a permanent wetland, which is excellent habitat for wintering waterfowl, wading birds and many other wetland dependent species. Prairie grasses were established between the water and the observation tower. Periodic mowing or burning of this prairie area prevents woody vegetation from obscuring the view from the platform and provides habitat for grassland birds and other wildlife species.

Handy Brake is managed as a waterfowl sanctuary and access is restricted to the area immediately adjacent to the observation tower.

See also
 List of National Wildlife Refuges: Louisiana

References

External links
 Handy Brake National Wildlife Refuge  - US Fish & Wildlife Service

Protected areas of Morehouse Parish, Louisiana
National Wildlife Refuges in Louisiana
Wetlands and bayous of Louisiana
Landforms of Morehouse Parish, Louisiana